Petru Leucă (born 19 July 1990) is a Moldovan professional footballer who plays as a forward.

Career

One of Moldova's top young prospects, Leuca was a leading figure in the Moldovan top-flight, the Divizia Nationala, for the first six years of his career, before being signed overseas. He ventured abroad playing in various countries including Lithuania, Greece and India, however, his stay at these clubs were short-lived due to the coronavirus pandemic, which cut short their league campaigns. 

A notable marquee signing in both Kuwait and Oman, Leuca subsequently attracted interest from Asian clubs including Chonburi and Persebaya, before starring for Nagaworld in Cambodia, scoring eight times.

International career
After featuring for Moldova at all age-group levels, he made his debut for the Moldova senior national team on 14 February 2015 in a friendly vs Romania in Aksu, Kazakhstan. He has been called up to the senior side a total of 12 times against opposition including Kazakhstan, Montenegro, Azerbaijan  and Albania, however, his debut against Romania remains his only appearance.

References

External links

1990 births
Living people
Footballers from Chișinău
Moldovan footballers
Moldova international footballers
Association football forwards
Moldovan expatriate footballers
FC Academia Chișinău players
FC Milsami Orhei players
FC Iskra-Stal players
FC Dacia Chișinău players
FC Ungheni players
CS Petrocub Hîncești players
FC Oleksandriya players
FK Jonava players
Khaitan SC players
Diagoras F.C. players
Sohar SC players
Moldovan Super Liga players
A Lyga players
Serie D players
Expatriate footballers in Ukraine
Expatriate footballers in Lithuania
Expatriate footballers in Kuwait
Expatriate footballers in Greece
Expatriate footballers in Oman
Expatriate footballers in Italy
Moldovan expatriate sportspeople in Ukraine
Moldovan expatriate sportspeople in Lithuania
Moldovan expatriate sportspeople in Greece
Moldovan expatriate sportspeople in Italy
Expatriate footballers in Cambodia
Moldovan expatriate sportspeople in Kuwait
Moldova youth international footballers
Moldova under-21 international footballers